Biz Television (commonly referred to as BizTV) is an American national television broadcast network owned by Center Post Media, which also owns Youtoo America, and BizTV's sister radio outlet, BizTalkRadio. The channel features programming devoted to entrepreneurs and small business owners. Uplinking facilities are located in Little Rock, Arkansas. The channel's corporate offices are located in Arlington, Texas.

Much of the radio and television content of BizTalkRadio and BizTV is the same on each medium, with numerous talk radio shows being carried on both.

BizTV is available to approximately 44 million television households in the United States. In addition to the household coverage across the US, BizTV is offered as an OTT feed; the feed is currently on a paywall and requires a paying subscription, which can be streamed live or on demand via its website, Roku or WebTV (The radio feed is free and does not require a paywall).

Programming
Programs airing on BizTV include:

 America Trends
 The Big Biz Show
 Bitcoin for Boomers
 Business Rockstars
 BTV Business Television
 Coop Dreams
 Create. Build. Manage.
 Create, Build, and Manage Daily Show
 C-Suite
 Elevator Pitch
 Financial Issues with Dan Celia
 Hiring America
 Laura McKenzie's Traveler
 Meet the Drapers
 MoneyTV
 Motorz
 The Playbook with David Meltzer
 Radio Night Live with Kevin McCullough
 Small Town Big Deal
 Steel Dreams
 Talk! with Audrey
 Transformative CEOs
 Travel TV with Stephanie Abrams

The channel also airs films under the BizTV Movies brand, which are mostly sourced from the Paramount Pictures and DreamWorks Pictures libraries, provided by Trifecta Entertainment & Media.

Affiliates

Former Affiliates

References

Television networks in the United States
Business-related television channels
Television channels and stations established in 2011
English-language television stations in the United States
Business mass media in the United States